Coptic Church Review is a Coptic Orthodox publication; published in the United States and founded in 1980 by Doctor Rodolph Yanney, president of the Society of Coptic Church Studies, in the US. It was originally based in East Brunswick, New Jersey. The magazine is published quarterly and is based in Lebanon, Pennsylvania.

References

External links
 Official website

Magazines established in 1980
Religious magazines published in the United States
Quarterly magazines published in the United States
Magazines published in Pennsylvania
Magazines published in New Jersey